The 2021–22 Coupe de France was the 105th season of the main football cup competition of France. The competition was organised by the French Football Federation (FFF) and was open to all clubs in French football, as well as clubs from the overseas departments and territories (Guadeloupe, French Guiana, Martinique, Mayotte, New Caledonia, Tahiti, Réunion, Saint Martin, and Saint Pierre and Miquelon).

The competition returned largely to the format of 2019–20 after the changes last season due to the COVID-19 pandemic in France. However, on 21 October 2021 it was announced that New Caledonia would not be represented in the competition due to the situation in that territory.

Paris Saint-Germain were the defending champions, but were knocked out in the round of 16 by Nice on penalties. In the final on 7 May, Nantes beat Nice 1–0 to claim their fourth Coupe de France title.

Dates
Dates for the first two qualifying round, and any preliminaries required, were set by the individual Regional leagues. From round three, the FFF defined the calendar, with rounds up to and including the round of 32 being scheduled for weekends. The later rounds up to, but not including, the final, taking place on midweek evenings. The final was originally scheduled for Saturday 8 May 2022, but moved to 7 May 2022.

Notable rule changes
After gaining a second seventh-round spot last season, Mayotte lost it this season, due to the FFF ruling that there were no stadia in the territory of the standard required to host a seventh-round match. The single qualifying team from Mayotte would therefore play its seventh-round match in mainland France.

After a DNCG ruling excluding Niort from the 2021–22 competition, only 19 Ligue 2 teams entered at the seventh-round stage.

The number of teams qualifying from each region returned to those of the 2019–20 competition, with adjustments to account for the above two points, i.e. 146 rather than 144 mainland teams qualified for the seventh round.

On 21 October 2021, it was announced that no team from New Caledonia would be present in the seventh round, due to the ongoing COVID-19 pandemic in New Caledonia, and the imposition of lockdown until 31 October 2021.

On 31 December 2021, due to the rising number of COVID-19 cases, the FFF suspended the competition rule which mandated that teams must field seven players who participated in one of the last two matches, in order to avoid potential postponements. From the Round of 32, teams may field any number of players from their reserve or youth teams.

Teams

Round 1 to 6

The first six rounds, and any preliminaries required, were organised by the Regional Leagues and the Overseas Territories, who allowed teams from within their league structure to enter at any point up to the third round. Teams from Championnat National 3 entered at the third round, those from Championnat National 2 entered at the fourth round and those from Championnat National entered at the fifth round.

The number of teams entering at each qualifying round was as follows:

Round 7
The 146 qualifiers from the Regional Leagues were joined by the 10 qualifiers from the Overseas Territories and 19 eligible 2021–22 Ligue 2 teams. The qualifiers from Réunion, Martinique, Guadeloupe and French Guiana play off in internal matches.

Ligue 2

 Ajaccio
 Amiens
 Auxerre
 Bastia
 Caen
 Dijon
 Dunkerque

 Grenoble
 Guingamp
 Le Havre
 Nancy
 Nîmes
 Quevilly-Rouen

 Paris FC
 Pau
 Rodez
 Sochaux
 Toulouse
 Valenciennes

Regional Leagues

Nouvelle Aquitaine (13 teams)
 Angoulême Charente FC (4)
 Bergerac Périgord FC (4)
 Trélissac FC (4)
 US Chauvigny (5)
 FC Libourne (5)
 Stade Bordelais (5)
 Stade Poitevin FC (5)
 ESA Brive (6)
 SAG Cestas (6)
 CS Feytiat (6)
 ES Guérétoise (6)
 AS Panazol (7)
 Limens JSA (8)

Pays de la Loire (11 teams)
 SO Cholet (3)
 Le Mans FC (3)
 Stade Lavallois (3)
 Les Herbiers VF (4)
 Voltigeurs de Châteaubriant (4)
 La Roche VF (5)
 US Philbertine Football (5)
 Olympique Saumur FC (5)
 ESOF La Roche-sur-Yon (6)
 USJA Carquefou (7)
 Luçon FC (7)

Centre-Val de Loire (6 teams)
 US Orléans (3)
 C'Chartres Football (4)
 J3S Amilly (5)
 FC Ouest Tourangeau (5)
 Vierzon FC (5)
 CS Mainvilliers (7)

Corsica (2 teams)
 FC Bastia-Borgo (3)
 Gazélec Ajaccio (5)

Bourgogne-Franche-Comté (8 teams)
 Jura Sud Foot (4)
 Jura Dolois Football (5)
 FC Morteau-Montlebon (5)
 ASC Saint-Apollinaire (5)
 Union Cosnoise Sportive (6)
 RC Lons-le-Saunier (6)
 Bresse Jura Foot (7)
 FR Saint Marcel (7)

Grand Est (19 teams)
 CS Sedan Ardennes (3)
 SC Schiltigheim (4)
 ASC Biesheim (5)
 FC Mulhouse (5)
 US Sarre-Union (5)
 ES Thaon (5)
 FC Soleil Bischheim (6)
 RC Champigneulles (6)
 AS Illzach Modenheim (6)
 FC Nogentais (6)
 EF Reims Sainte-Anne Châtillons (6)
 FC Sarrebourg (6)
 ASL Kœtzingue (7)
 RS Magny (7)
 ES Molsheim-Ernolsheim (7)
 AS Morhange (7)
 US Thionville Lusitanos (7)
 FC Éloyes (8)
 UL Plantières Metz (8)

Méditerranée (5 teams)
 Aubagne FC (4)
 FC Martigues (4)
 AS Cannes (5)
 ES Cannet Rocheville (5)
 FC Istres (5)

Occitanie (10 teams)
 Canet Roussillon FC (4)
 RCO Agde (5)
 Olympique Alès (5)
 AS Muret (5)
 AS Frontignan AC (6)
 Toulouse Métropole FC (6)
 JS Chemin Bas d'Avignon (7)
 Montauban FCTG (7)
 FC Chusclan-Laudun-l'Ardoise (8)
 FC Langlade (10)

Hauts-de-France (20 teams)
 FC Chambly (3)
 AS Beauvais Oise (4)
 AC Amiens (5)
 Feignies Aulnoye FC (5)
 Wasquehal Football (5)
 Stade Béthunois (6)
 AC Cambrai (6)
 FC Loon-Plage (6)
 Olympique Lumbrois (6)
 US Tourcoing FC (6)
 ES Bully-les-Mines (7)
 AS Étaples (7)
 US Esquelbecq (7)
 FC Raismes (7)
 US Mineurs Waziers (7)
 Calonne-Ricouart FC Cite 6 (8)
 FC Dutemple (8)
 ES Anzin-Saint-Aubin (9)
 ESM Hamel (10)
 RC Salouël (10)

Normandy (8 teams)
 FC Rouen (4)
 AG Caennaise (5)
 Évreux FC 27 (5)
 CMS Oissel (5)
 FC Saint-Lô Manche (5)
 AS Trouville-Deauville (6)
 AS Val de Reuil-Vaudreuil-Poses (7)
 FC Saint-Julien Petit Quevilly (8)

Brittany (14 teams)
 Stade Briochin (3)
 Stade Plabennécois (4)
 US Saint-Malo (4)
 Vannes OC (4)
 AS Vitré (4)
 Dinan-Léhon FC (5)
 Fougères AGLD (5)
 Lannion FC (5)
 US Trégunc (5)
 PD Ergué-Gabéric (6)
 US Liffré (6)
 Plancoët-Arguenon FC (7)
 US Perros-Louannec (7)
 CS Plédran (8)

Paris-Île-de-France (11 teams)
 US Créteil-Lusitanos (3)
 Red Star F.C. (3)
 Football Club 93 Bobigny-Bagnolet-Gagny (4)
 AS Poissy (4)
 FC Versailles 78 (4)
 ESA Linas-Montlhéry (5)
 Espérance Aulnay (6)
 Cergy Pontoise FC (6)
 AS Chatou (6)
 US Sénart-Moissy (6)
 ES Nanterre (7)

Auvergne-Rhône-Alpes (19 teams)
 Football Bourg-en-Bresse Péronnas 01 (3)
 FC Villefranche (3)
 Andrézieux-Bouthéon FC (4)
 Le Puy Foot 43 Auvergne (4)
 Lyon La Duchère (4)
 Moulins Yzeure Foot (4)
 Ain Sud Foot (5)
 FC Bourgoin-Jallieu (5)
 Chambéry SF (5)
 Hauts Lyonnais (5)
 FC Limonest Saint-Didier (5)
 Montluçon Football (5)
 US Blavozy (6)
 Vénissieux FC (6)
 RC Vichy (6)
 Côte Chaude Sportif (7)
 AS Montchat Lyon (7)
 CS Neuville (7)
 FC Saint-Cyr Collonges au Mont d'Or (8)

Overseas Territories teams

 Mayotte: 1 team
 AS Jumeaux de M'zouazia
 Réunion: 2 teams
 ASC Makes
 Saint-Denis FC

 Martinique: 2 teams
 Club Colonial
 Club Franciscain
 Guadeloupe: 2 teams
 Solidarité-Scolaire
 AS Gosier

 French Guiana: 2 teams
 ASC Ouest
 CSC Cayenne
 Tahiti: 1 team
 A.S. Vénus

 New Caledonia: 0 teams
 none

Round 8
The winners of the seventh round matches in Guadeloupe and Martinique played their eighth round matches at home against teams from mainland France. Should the team from Tahiti win their seventh round match, they would also play a home game against a team from mainland France. On 2 November 2021 a draw took place to prioritise the list of National, National 2 and National 3 clubs who had put themselves forward as candidates for overseas travel. The highest prioritised team which qualifies for the eighth round will travel to Guadeloupe, the second highest will travel to Martinique and the third highest will travel to Tahiti if required.

Priority list of mainland teams

 ASC Saint-Apollinaire (5)
 SO Cholet (3)
 US Sarre-Union (5)
 Football Club 93 Bobigny-Bagnolet-Gagny (4)
 US Philbertine Football (5)
 Dinan-Léhon FC (5)
 CMS Oissel (5)
 Wasquehal Football (5)
 Évreux FC 27 (5)
 ES Thaon (5)
 FC Versailles 78 (4)
 Olympique Saumur FC (5)

Round of 64
The 44 qualifying teams from Round 8 were joined by the 20 2021–22 Ligue 1 teams. 32 ties were drawn in regional groups.

 Angers
 Bordeaux
 Brest
 Clermont
 Lens
 Lille
 Lorient

 Lyon
 Marseille
 Metz
 Monaco
 Montpellier
 Nantes
 Nice

 Paris Saint-Germain
 Reims
 Rennes
 Saint-Étienne
 Strasbourg
 Troyes

Later rounds
Later rounds are open draws with no regional grouping.

Seventh round
Due to there being no New Caledeonia team in the seventh round draw, a mainland team were awarded a bye to the eighth round.

 The seventh round in Guadeloupe, Martinique, French Guiana and Réunion took place between the two qualifying teams from each territory, and are pre-drawn by the local league.
 Teams were divided into ten groups, by geography and to ensure the groups are balanced in terms of the levels of the teams. The teams from Tahiti and Mayotte were included in groups E and I respectively. An exempt ball was included in group J.

Overseas playoff ties

Main draw
The main draw was carried out on 3 November 2021. Ties will be played on 12, 13 and 14 November 2021. Several ties were played at alternate stadia due to the stadium of the home clubs not being of sufficient standard.

Group A

Group B

Group C

Group D

Group E

Group F

Group G

Group H

Group I

Group J

PD Ergué-Gabéric (6) were drawn as the team given a bye into the eighth round.

Eighth round 
The eighth round draw was pre-determined at the same time as the seventh-round draw. Groupings were carried forward from the seventh round, with the mainland teams travelling for overseas ties replaced by overseas teams that were travelling to the mainland.

Overseas ties

Group A

Group B

Group C

Group D

Group E

Group F

Group G

Group H

Group I

Group J

Round of 64
The round of 64 draw was made on 29 November 2021, with teams divided into four groups by geography and to ensure the groups were balanced in terms of the levels of the teams.

Group A

Group B

Group C

Group D

Round of 32
The round of 32 draw was made on 19 December 2021. This was an open draw.

Round of 16
The round of 16 draw was made on 4 January 2022. This was an open draw.

Quarter-finals
The quarter-finals draw was made on 31 January 2022. This was an open draw.

Semi-finals
The semi-finals draw was made on 10 February 2022. This was an open draw.

Final

References

External links

 
France
Cup
Coupe de France seasons